The Moel Hebog shield or Moel Siabod shield is a large copper-alloy Yetholm-type shield from Bronze Age Britain, found in Wales in 1784, and now in the British Museum in London. It dates from 1300–1000 BC.

Description 

The late Bronze Age shield was found in a bog near Moel Hebog mountain in 1784, near Beddgelert. It is now in the British Museum's collection. Other sources point to a finding on Moel Siabod.

Richard Blurton wrote of the shield in the book The Enduring Image: Treasures from the British Museum, "This shield is a splendid example, representative of the rise of large sheet-bronze work in later Bronze Age Europe. Much effort was directed towards the production of ceremonial metal armour indicating the prevalence of the idea of man as a warrior."

There have been calls for the artefact to be returned to Wales.

See also 
 Archaeology of Wales

References 

Archaeology of Wales
Bronze Age Wales
Individual shields
Prehistoric objects in the British Museum
Welsh artefacts